Moor High School was a historically black, public secondary school in Starkville, Mississippi.

History
Moor served as a high school for black students until the public schools were integrated in 1970, after which it was technically integrated, although very few white students ever attended. Enrollment was combined with Alexander High School to form East Oktibbeha County High School at the same site. Eventually, the Mississippi Legislature forced the Oktibbeha County School District to merge with the predominantly white Starkville School District to become the Starkville Oktibbeha Consolidated School District.

As of 2016, the site was abandoned.

In 2023, the school was re-purposed into a unique wedding venue and boutique motel, The Hill and Moor and The Tangerine Motel.

Notable alumni
 Jerry Rice, football player

References

Public high schools in Mississippi
Schools in Oktibbeha County, Mississippi
Historically black schools
Historically segregated African-American schools in Mississippi
Defunct schools in Mississippi
Education in Oktibbeha County, Mississippi